Springfield is a city in Brown County, Minnesota, United States. The population was 2,152 at the 2010 census.

U.S. Highway 14 serves as a main route in the community. This location is in the middle of some of Minnesota's most productive farmland. The City was home to Minnesota's sole brick plant up until its closure in 2016.

History

Jackson, Minnesota was originally platted with the name Springfield in 1856.

Springfield was originally platted in 1877  with the name of "Burns" when the Chicago and North Western Railway extended a line to the settlement. It was renamed in 1881 after either Springfield, Massachusetts. or a nearby spring.

In 1890 Adolph Casimir Ochs established the Ochs Brick and Tile Company in Springfield and Heron Lake.  It remains in Operation today.  In 1917 Frank Sanborn established the Sanborn Company in Springfield manufacturing medical instruments. Hewlett-Packard company acquired the Sanborn Company in 1961 and they sold it in 1999 to Philips Medical Systems.  The Sanborn Company also remains in Springfield.

Springfield has three Lutheran Chruches as well as a Catholic and United Methodist.  The town still retains active rail service from the Iowa, Chicago and Eastern Railroad a subsidiary of the Canadian Pacific.

Twelve miles south of town on County Road 2 is the Jeffers Petroglyphs State Park

Geography
The Cottonwood River flows through the city.

Demographics

2010 census
As of the census of 2010, there were 2,152 people, 913 households, and 558 families living in the city. The racial makeup of the city was 95% White, 0.8% African American, 0.2% Native American, 0.4% Asian, 0.6% from other races, and 0.8% from two or more races. Hispanic or Latino of any race were 4.6% of the population.

There were 913 households, of which 27.1% had children under the age of 18 living with them, 50.9% were married couples living together, 6.8% had a female householder with no husband present, 3.4% had a male householder with no wife present, and 38.9% were non-families. 34.6% of all households were made up of individuals, and 20.7% had someone living alone who was 65 years of age or older. The average household size was 2.24 and the average family size was 2.88.

The median age in the city was 46.8 years. 22.5% of residents were under the age of 18; 6% were between the ages of 18 and 24; 19.4% were from 25 to 44; 25.7% were from 45 to 64; and 26.3% were 65 years of age or older. The gender makeup of the city was 47.6% male and 52.4% female.

2000 census
As of the census of 2000, there were 2,215 people, 897 households, and 562 families living in the city. The racial makeup of the city was 98.33% White, 0.32% Native American, 0.45% Asian, 0.63% from other races, and 0.27% from two or more races. Hispanic or Latino of any race were 1.99% of the population.

There were 897 households, out of which 30.2% had children under the age of 18 living with them, 53.7% were married couples living together, 5.2% had a female householder with no husband present, and 37.3% were non-families. 34.6% of all households were made up of individuals, and 22.4% had someone living alone who was 65 years of age or older.  The average household size was 2.33 and the average family size was 3.03.

In the city, the population was spread out, with 26.0% under the age of 18, 5.7% from 18 to 24, 22.4% from 25 to 44, 18.6% from 45 to 64, and 27.3% who were 65 years of age or older.  The median age was 42 years. For every 100 females, there were 86.9 males.  For every 100 females age 18 and over, there were 83.2 males.

The median income for a household in the city was $34,643, and the median income for a family was $41,071. Males had a median income of $30,000 versus $21,779 for females. The per capita income for the city was $16,977.  About 2.5% of families and 6.5% of the population were below the poverty line, including 3.6% of those under age 18 and 12.4% of those age 65 or over.

Notable people
Bernie Bierman, one of the most successful coaches in Minnesota Golden Gophers football history, was born in Springfield.
Marty Seifert, who served the Minnesota House of Representatives as House Minority Leader from 2006 through 2009, was born in Springfield.
Glen Taylor, prominent Minnesota businessman and owner of the Minnesota Timberwolves was born in Springfield.

In popular culture
The town was often mentioned on Little House on the Prairie as the town to which Charles Ingalls would frequently go for his "business travels".

References

External links
 City of Springfield
 Springfield Chamber of Commerce

Cities in Brown County, Minnesota
Cities in Minnesota